The United States Army Pigeon Service (a.k.a. Signal Pigeon Corps) was a unit of the United States Army during World War I and World War II. Their assignment was the training and usage of homing pigeons for communication and reconnaissance purposes.

During World War II, the force consisted of 3,150 soldiers and 54,000 war pigeons, which were considered an undetectable method of communication. Over 90% of US Army messages sent by pigeons were received.

From 1917 to 1943 and 1946 to 1957, the US Army Pigeon Breeding and Training Center was based at Fort Monmouth, N.J.  From October 1943 until June 1946, the center was based at Camp Crowder. The US Army discontinued using pigeons as message carriers in 1957.  Fifteen "hero pigeons" were donated to zoos, and about a thousand other pigeons were sold to the public.

Famous Pigeons in Service to the Signal Pigeon Corps

G.I. Joe 
During the Italian Campaign of World War II, G.I. Joe was a pigeon who saved the lives of the inhabitants of the village of Calvi Vecchia, Italy, and of the British troops of 56th (London) Infantry Division occupying it. Air support had been requested against German positions at Calvi Vecchia on 18 October 1943, but the message that the 169th (London) Infantry Brigade had captured the village, delivered by G.I. Joe, arrived just in time to avoid the bombing. G.I. Joe flew this 20-mile distance in an impressive 20 minutes, just as the planes were preparing to take off for the target. He saved the lives of at least 100  men.

For his efforts, G.I. Joe was presented the Dickin Medal for "the most outstanding flight made by a United States Army pigeon in World War II."

President Wilson 
Born in France, President Wilson's initial assignment was to the U.S. Army's newly formed Tank Corps. He first saw action delivering messages for the 326th and 327th Tank Battalions commanded by Colonel George S. Patton in the Battle of Saint-Mihiel. Assigned to the forward most squad in the advance, he was released from the turret of a tank to fly back with the locations of enemy machine gun nests. Artillery could then be brought to bear before the infantry advanced.

Following this action, he was in support of an infantry unit, the 78th Division, who were conducting operations in the vicinity of Grandpré, France during the Meuse-Argonne Offensive. On the morning of 5 October 1918, his unit came under attack and was heavily engaged in a firefight with the enemy. President Wilson was released to deliver a request for artillery support, flying back to his loft at Rampont forty kilometers away; he drew the attention of the German soldiers who fired a nearly impenetrable wall of lead blocking his path. Despite this, President Wilson managed to deliver the lifesaving message within twenty-five minutes. When he landed, it was found that his left leg had been shot away and that he had a gaping wound in his breast.

Surviving his wounds, President Wilson retired to the U.S. Army Signal Corps Breeding and Training Center where he eventually died in 1929.

Cher Ami 
Cher Ami, meaning "Dear Friend" in French, was a homing pigeon initially donated to the Signal Pigeon Corps by France. She spent several months on the front lines in 1918 and over the course of World War 1 delivered 12 messages in total. However, the most important mission she flew was on 4 October 1918, (merely one day before President Wilson's key flight) and she ultimately ended up saving the lives of over 200 men. The French awarded the pigeon a Croix de Guerre for her actions.

Pigeon care and maintenance 
By the beginning of World War 2, the U.S. Army had approximately 54,000 pigeons working under the Signal Pigeon Corps. As these birds became more frequently used over the course of the war, the U.S. Army Veterinary Service had to dedicate a unit to "the protection of pigeon health, the preservation of their physical efficiency, and the safeguard against introducing or disseminating pigeon-borne diseases affecting other animals and the human being."

These objectives were obtained by furnishing professional services and supervisory assistance in the care, feeding, housing, and transporting of pigeons; conducting laboratory diagnostic and investigative studies on pigeon diseases; establishing controls against the diseases of pigeons by quarantine procedures; inspecting and reporting on factors having a bearing on pigeon health; and giving technical assistance in the training of pigeoneers. Although 36,000 pigeons were deployed overseas, the foregoing veterinary services were not practiced uniformly in all of the theaters and oversea areas because of the newness in the concept of military veterinary medicine for the Army Pigeon Service.

Although there were a number of factors of interest to the Army Veterinary Service bearing on the health of signal pigeons, the more common ones included their feed supply and housing. A balanced feed and good feeding practices were essential to the well being of the signal pigeons and had a direct bearing on their homing proficiency. The feed was procured by the Signal Corps; unfortunately, large quantities of it, packed in burlap bags, were found deteriorated or unusable after arrival in the oversea theaters. The bags were torn by rough handling or were readily eaten into by rodents, and the grain contents became damp, moldy, or vermin infested.

Proper housing for signal pigeons was also a problem, particularly in the overseas theaters. Though lofts of standardized design accompanied the units arriving from the U.S., some were remodeled to meet the variable climatic conditions which were encountered in the Central Pacific Area, and open-front lofts were constructed. Emphasis was placed on having lofts which were exposed to sunlight, dry, and draft-free, and on keeping the lofts in a good sanitation.

References

External links
Army Signal Pigeons

Domestic pigeons
Pigeon Service
Military units and formations of the United States Army in World War II